Adolphe Jean-Baptiste Bayot (1810–1866), was a French lithographer.

External links

French lithographic artists
1810 births
1866 deaths